Supor, full name Zhejiang Supor Co., Ltd., is a Chinese cookware and small appliances company, headquartered in Binjiang District, Hangzhou, Zhejiang, China. It was founded in 1994. In 2006 it was the largest such company in China. That year SEB Internationale SAS, a French company, paid 2.37 billion yuan (US$296 million) to acquire Supor. It was the first Chinese cookware company to be listed on a stock market.

References

External links
 Supor 
 Supor 

Home appliance manufacturers of China
Manufacturing companies based in Hangzhou
Chinese companies established in 1994
Chinese brands